Ahmet Aytar (1922 – 1 May 1992) was a Turkish long-distance runner who competed in the 1952 Summer Olympics.

References

1922 births
1992 deaths
Turkish male long-distance runners
Turkish male marathon runners
Olympic athletes of Turkey
Athletes (track and field) at the 1952 Summer Olympics
Mediterranean Games gold medalists for Turkey
Mediterranean Games medalists in athletics
Athletes (track and field) at the 1951 Mediterranean Games
20th-century Turkish people
21st-century Turkish people